The Second Plane (2008) is a collection of twelve pieces of nonfiction and two short stories by the British writer Martin Amis on the subject of the 9/11 attacks, terrorism, Muslim radicalisation and the subsequent global War on Terror.

Essays collected
The Second Plane is Amis's seventh collection of nonfiction, drawing upon pieces written for The Guardian, The Observer, The Times, The New Yorker, and The New York Times between 2001-2007 and is by far one of the most controversial and divisive publications of his literary career to date.

Contents 
 "The Second Plane," The Guardian, September 18, 2001
 "The Voice of the Lonely Crowd," The Guardian, June, 2002
 "The Wrong War," The Guardian, March, 2003
 "In the Palace of the End" The New Yorker, March, 2004
 "Terror and Boredom: The Dependent Mind," The Observer, September, 2006
 "The Last Days of Muhammad Atta," The New Yorker, April, 2006
 "Iran and the Lord of Time," The New York Times Syndicate, June, 2006
 "What Will Survive of Us," The Times, June, 2006
 "Conspiracy Theories, and Takfir," The Times, September, 2006
 "Bush in Yes Man Land," The Times, October, 2006
 "Demographics," The Times, April, 2007
 "On the Move with Tony Blair," The Guardian, June, 2007
 "An Islamist's Journey," The Times, May, 2007
 "September 11," The Times, September 11, 2007

Controversy
The Second Plane emerged following an accusation of racism levelled at Amis by Marxist theorist Terry Eagleton in 2007, following comments made by Amis in a 2006 interview.

Notes

External links
Amis in The Guardian with the essay that serves as the collection's title

Books by Martin Amis
2008 non-fiction books
Jonathan Cape books